Marc J. Leder is co-founder and co-chief executive officer of Sun Capital Partners Inc, a global private equity firm, based in Boca Raton, Florida, United States.

Early life and education
Leder was born in 1962 to a Jewish family and raised in the Long Island suburbs of New York City. In 1979, Leder graduated from John L. Miller Great Neck North High School and in 1983, earned his Bachelor of Science degree in economics from the Wharton School of the University of Pennsylvania. He currently serves as a member of the University of Pennsylvania Huntsman Program Advisory Board and is on the Board of Institute of Contemporary Art at the University of Pennsylvania.

Career
In 1987, he accepted a position as an analyst at Lehman Brothers working his way up to Senior Vice president. In 1995, he left Lehman with fellow Wharton School of the University of Pennsylvania alumni and friend Rodger Krouse to found Sun Capital Partners, Inc.

Sun Capital Partners

Sun Capital Partners, Inc. is a global private equity firm focused on partnering with outstanding management teams to accelerate value creation. Since 1995, Sun Capital has invested in more than 500 companies worldwide with revenues in excess of $50 billion across a broad range of industries and transaction structures. Sun Capital focuses on defensible businesses in growing markets with tangible performance improvement opportunities in the Business Services, Consumer, Healthcare, Industrial, and Technology sectors. The Firm has offices in Boca Raton, Los Angeles and New York, and an affiliate with offices in London.

Sun Capital targets businesses with revenues of $50 million to $1.0 billion for platform investments, and any revenue size for add-ons to existing portfolio companies. Sun Capital's experienced team looks at every investment through a lens focused on where they can work closely with management to grow the business and accelerate value creation. Sun Capital's operations team is an integral part of the firm, working alongside founders and management to help improve businesses and make them more competitive in their markets. As a founder-led firm, Sun Capital has a deep respect and appreciation for the work founders and families have done to build their businesses and has a deep understanding of what they need from a partner during both healthy and challenging economic cycles.

Affiliated Investments
Leder is a member of the investment group that won a $280 million bid for the purchase of the Philadelphia 76ers. The other members of the investment group are: Joshua Harris of the private equity firm Apollo Global Management, portfolio manager Art Wrubel, and former NBA agent and Sacramento Kings executive Jason Levien, as well as former Vail Resorts CEO Adam Aron, Martin J. Geller, David B. Heller, Travis Hennings, James Lassiter, David S. Blitzer, Michael Rubin, Will Smith & Jada Pinkett Smith, and Indonesian businessmen Handy Soetedjo & Erick Thohir. Comcast-Spectacor began talks with the investment group in the summer of 2011. The deal was announced on July 13, 2011. The NBA formally approved the deal on October 18. Leder is also a member of a group led by Harris and partner David Blitzer that purchased a majority stake in the New Jersey Devils of the NHL, which includes the rights to operate the Prudential Center arena in Newark, New Jersey. The transaction was reportedly for over $320 million. Leder, as minority owner, serves on the board of the Philadelphia 76ers and the NJ Devils. Leder is also a minority investor in Crystal Palace Football Club, a professional football club based in Selhurst in the Borough of Croydon, South London, England, who compete in the Premier League, the highest level of English football.

Philanthropy and Accolades
The Sun Capital Partners Foundation has donated to over 700 charities. Among those charities is Boca Helping Hands, a non-profit organization based in South Florida that works to fight poverty and hunger in the area. The Foundation has also donated over $100,000 to Operation Homefront Florida, an organization that works to provide financial assistance to military service members and their families. The Foundation also hosts a half marathon and 5K that raises money for the Boca Raton Police Athletic League and Boca Raton Firefighters. 

Leder was an honoree at the Art for Life 2011 to honor the creative energy of New York City youth and professional accomplishments and philanthropic efforts of individuals in the community. The Marc J. Leder Foundation, Inc. is a non-profit corporation based in Boca Raton that partially funds the Sun Capital Partners Foundation as well as makes grants to institutions such as the University of Pennsylvania. 

In 2018, he established the Marc J. Leder Behavior Change for Good Term Fund at the School of Arts & Sciences and the Wharton School of the University of Pennsylvania. Leder is a member of the International Counsel for the Museum Berggruen and he sits on the Board of the Institute of Contemporary Arts at the University of Pennsylvania, where he endowed the Marc J. Leder Director of Curatorial Affairs.

Leder received the 2003 Buyout Magazine Pros of the Years by Thomson Venture Economics, a Thomson Financial company and publisher of Buyouts Newsletter and received a leadership award by the M&A Advisor in 2013.

Personal life
In 1987, Leder married Lisa J. Weisbein; they have three children. They divorced in 2009. In January 2012, Leder had another  daughter.

References

Other sources

Foroohar, Kambiz "Blackstone, Apollo Outshone as Sun Capital Buys Boston Market", Bloomberg, 2 October 2008. Retrieved 19 March 2012.
Kumar, Prameet "Wharton alums purchase 76ers", The Daily Pennsylvanian, Philadelphia, 21 July 2011. Retrieved 2 March 2012.
Noto, Anthony "EXCLUSIVE: Sun Capital Buys The Uniform Place", Mergers & Acquisitions, 21 December 2011. Retrieved 19 March 2012.

Gavrilos, James S. "Sun Capital Partners, Inc. supports Boca Helping Hands to Fight Poverty and Hunger", Boca Helping Hands, September 21, 2011. Retrieved 19 March 2012.
"Sun Capital Partners Donation" Retrieved 19 March 2012.
"12th Annual Art for Life 2011!" Retrieved 19 March 2012.
"Marc J. Leder Foundation, Inc." Retrieved 19 March 2012.
“Behind the Buyouts: Sun Capital's Leder Talks Post-Close Value Creation.” Retrieved 30 June 2021.

External links
"Marc J. Leder" page at Sun Capital website

Living people
1962 births
People from Great Neck, New York
People from Palm Beach, Florida
American chief executives
Philanthropists from New York (state)
Jewish American philanthropists
Jewish American sportspeople
People from Boca Raton, Florida
Lehman Brothers people
Private equity and venture capital investors
Great Neck North High School alumni
Wharton School of the University of Pennsylvania alumni
21st-century American Jews